The music of the Ionian Islands is the music of the geographic and historical region of the Ionian Islands. Folk music of the Ionian Islands is largely based on the western European style. It is dominant the use of guitars and mandolins, while the kantadhes (romantic serenades from the Ionian Islands) are very popular. The island of Zakynthos has a diverse musical history with influences from Crete. 

The Church music of the islands is also different from the rest of Greece's, with much western and Catholic influences on the Byzantine Rite. The region is also notable for the birth of the first school of modern Greek classical music (Heptanese or Ionian School, Greek: Επτανησιακή Σχολή), established in 1815. Some notable composers of the classical Ionian School are Nikolaos Mantzaros, Dionysios Lavrangas and Nikos Hatziapostolou.

Folk dances of the islands include:
Ai Georgis
Ballos
Cerigotikos
Diavaritikos
Fourlana
Kerkiraikos
Syrtos

Notable artists 

Composers:
Fotis Aleporos
Dionysios Apostolatos
Dimitris Lagios
Dionysios Lavrangas
Spyros Markatos
Nikos Hatziapostolou

Singers:
Spyros and Makis Karaviotis

See also
Music of Greece
Greek dances
Greek folk music
Ionian School (music)

References

Greek music
Culture of the Ionian Islands